The  Women's tandem 1 km time trial B at the 2014 Commonwealth Games, was part of the cycling programme, which took place on 27 July 2014.

Results

References

Women's tandem 1km time trial B
Cycling at the Commonwealth Games – Women's tandem 1 km time trial B